The New South Wales Football Association was the governing body for Australian rules football in New South Wales between 1880 and 1893. It oversaw an Australian rules competition based in Sydney and governed the Laws of Australian Football in the colony. Matches were mostly played at Moore Park in Sydney.

Background 

Harry Hedger and George Walker, rugby players of the Waratah Football Club were among the first to agitate for the adoption of Australian rules in New South Wales, citing the enormous popularity of the code in the rival colony of Victoria. Having learned the game playing test matches against the Carlton Football Club of Melbourne in 1877 the players urged others to put aside their intercolonial rivalry and take up the sport.

In late June 1880 a large ground of rugby players, dissatisfied with the British games rules, gathered to form a new competition that would adopt the Victorian rules. The two founding member clubs were Sydney and East Sydney, formed on August 7, 1880. he first season commenced in 1881. The body saw it necessary to make rule changes to appeal to rugby followers, in particular, was vocal on the necessity of a Push in the back rule to reduce the game's roughness and make it more appealing to rugby players.

By 1883 there were 9 clubs in the assocaition. Among the clubs that were formed were West Sydney, South Sydney, City, Our Boys, Granville, Wallsend, Merewether, Hamilton, St Ignatius and St Joseph college  along with Balmain and Woollahra formed a year later. By 1883 there were 

The NSWFA began a sharp decline in interest from 1890 which Healy (2022) attributes to a combination of the departure of the president and Cricket Phillip Sheridan (trustee of what is now the Sydney Cricket Ground) and an Australian economic depression leaving the association without access to enclosed grounds. Poor management also impacted the long term sustainabililty of the competition.

The SRFU instituted a ban on rugby players from playing Australian rules which impacted playing numbers. By 1893 there were no clubs left to continue the competition.

Clubs

References

Defunct Australian rules football competitions in New South Wales
1893 disestablishments in Australia
1880 establishments in Australia
Sports leagues established in 1880
Australian rules football in Australia